Sarojini Sahoo (born 4 January 1956) is an Indian feminist writer, a columnist in The New Indian Express and an associate editor of Chennai-based English magazine Indian AGE. She has been enlisted among  25 Exceptional Women of India by Kindle Magazine of Kolkata. and is an Odisha Sahitya Academy Award winner.

Life 
Born in the small town of Dhenkanal in Odisha (India), Sahoo earned her MA and PhD degrees in Odia Literature and a Bachelor of Law from Utkal University. She now teaches at a degree college in Belpahar, Jharsuguda, Odisha.

She is the second daughter of Ishwar Chandra Sahoo and the late Nalini Devi and is married to Jagadish Mohanty, a veteran writer of Odisha. She has a son and a daughter.

Fictions 
Her novel Gambhiri Ghara  proved to be a bestseller in Odia literature. Her novels have gained a reputation for their feminist outlook and sexual frankness and have been translated into English and published from India under the title The Dark Abode (2008) and published from Bangladesh in Bengali as Mithya Gerosthali ( 2007 ). Prameela K.P has translated this novel into Malayalam and has been published as "Irunda Koodaram" by Chintha Publishers, Thiruvananthapuram.  Martina Fuchs for German and Dinesh Kumar Mali for Hindi. Another novel Pakhibas has been translated into Bengali and published from Bangladesh under the same title in 2009. This novel has been translated into Hindi by Dinesh Kumar Mali and has been published with same title by Yash Publication, Delhi in 2010. Also, Dinesh Kumar Mali translated two more novel in Hindi titled बंद कमरा and विशादेश्वरी published from Rajpal and Sons, New Delhi and Yash publication, New Delhi. The same translator had translated  सरोजिनी साहू की दलित कहानियाँ and रेप तथा अन्य कहानियां published from Yash publication, New Delhi as well as Rajpal and Sons, New Delhi.

Essays 
She has published a collection of essays titled 'Sensible Sensuality (2010), where redefining femininity with Eastern perspective, the book explores why sexuality plays a major role in our understanding of Eastern feminism. The author thinks feminism should not act in opposition to men as individuals. To her, feminism is against oppressive and outdated social structures which forces both men and women into positions which are false and antagonistic. Thus, everyone has an important role to play in the feminist movement. It seems ironic that feminism has been characterized as anti-male, when in fact, it seeks to liberate men from the macho stereotypic roles men often have to endure such as the need to suppress feelings, act aggressively, and be deprived of contact with children. Sahoo thinks people should emphasize their femininity rather to impose the so-called stereotyped feministic attitude of the second wave.

As an Indian feminist, many of Sarojini Sahoo's writings deal candidly with female sexuality, the emotional lives of women, and the intricate fabric of human relationships, depicting extensively about the interior experiences of women and how their burgeoning sexuality is seen as a threat to traditional patriarchal societies; this book is rare of its kind and has covered the topics that never be discussed so far in any Indian discourse. Her debatable concept on feminism, her denial of Simone De Beauvoir's 'the other theory', make her a prominent feminist personality of South Asia and for which KINDLE Magazine of India has placed her among 25 exceptional mindset women of India.

Thoughts and themes

Feminism 
Sarojini Sahoo is a key figure and trendsetter of feminism in contemporary Indian literature. For her, feminism is not a "gender problem" or confrontational attack on male hegemony and, as such, differs from the feminist views of Virginia Woolf or Judith Butler. Sahoo accepts feminism as an integral part of femaleness separate from the masculine world. Writing with a heightened awareness of women's bodies, she has developed an appropriate style that exploits openness, fragmentation, and nonlinearity. Sahoo, however contends that whilst the woman identity is certainly constitutionally different from that of man, men and women still share a basic human equality. Thus the harmful asymmetric sex /gender "Othering" arises accidentally and 'passively'from natural, unavoidable intersubjectivity.

Treating female sexuality from puberty to menopause, her fiction always projects a feminine sensibility. Feminine feelings such as restrictions during adolescence or pregnancy, fear factors such as rape or being condemned by society, the concept of the "bad girl," and so on, are treated thematically and in-depth throughout her novels and short stories.

Her feminism is constantly linked to the sexual politics of a woman. She denies patriarchal limits of sexual expression for a woman and she identifies women's sexual liberation as the real motive behind the women's movement. In South Asian Outlook, an e-magazine published from Canada, Menka Walia writes: "Sahoo typically evolves her stories around Indian women and sexuality, which is something not commonly written about, but is rather discouraged in a traditionalist society. As a feminist, she advocates women's rights and usually gives light to the injustices Eastern women face. In her interviews, she usually talks about the fact that women are second-class citizens in India, backing up these facts with examples of how love marriages are forbidden, the rejection of divorces, the unfairness of dowries, and the rejection of female politicians."
For her, orgasm is the body's natural call to feminist politics: if being a woman is this good, women must be worth something. Her novels like Upanibesh, Pratibandi and Gambhiri Ghara  cover a myriad of areas from sexuality to philosophy; from the politics of the home to politics of the world. According to American journalist Linda Lowen, Sarojini Sahoo has written extensively as an Indian feminist about the interior lives of women and how their burgeoning sexuality is seen as a threat to traditional patriarchal societies. Sarojini's novels and short stories treat women as sexual beings and probe culturally sensitive topics such as rape, abortion and menopause – from a female perspective.

Sexuality
Sexuality is something that can be related to many other aspects of culture, tightly-linked with an individual life, or into the evolution of a culture.  Anyone's class or ethnic or geographic identity could be closely associated to his/her sexuality, or anyone's sense of art or literature.  Sexuality is not just an entity in itself.

Still, either in West or in East, there is a reluctant outlook towards sexuality. Society has always tried to hide it from any open forum. But neither society, nor the legislature, or even the judiciary stand by the side of sexuality to support it.

In the West, James Joyce's Ulysses or even Radclyffe Hall's Loneliness in the Well or Virginia Woolf's  Orlando are some examples which have to suffer a lot for describing sexuality in literature. Sexuality in literature grew with feminism.

Simone De Beauvoir, in her book The Second Sex, first elaborately described the gender role and problem away from biological differences. In Odia literature, Sarojini is considered a key figure to discuss sexuality in her fiction with a sincere effort to express her feminist ideas.

Her novel Upanibesh was the first attempt in Odia literature to focus on sexuality as a part of social revolt by any woman. Medha, the protagonist of her novel, was a bohemian .  In her pre-marital stage, she was thinking that it was boring to live with a man lifelong.  Perhaps she wanted a chain free life, where there would be only love, only sex and would not be any monotony.  But she had to marry Bhaskar.  Can Indian society imagine a lady with bohemianism?

In her novel Pratibandi, Sarojini has also described the thematic development of sexuality in a woman.  Priyanka, the protagonist of the novel has to encounter the loneliness in the exile of Saragpali, a remote village of India.  This loneliness develops into a sexual urge and soon, Priyanka finds herself sexually attached with a former Member of Parliament.  Though there is an age gap between them, his intelligence impresses her and she discovers a hidden archaeologist in him.

In her novel Gambhiri Ghara, she describes an unusual relationship between two people: a Hindu housewife of India and a Muslim artist of Pakistan. It is a net-oriented novel.  A woman meets a very sexually experienced man.  One day he asks if she had any such experience.  The woman, Kuki, scolds him and insults him by calling him a caterpillar.  She said without love, lust is like hunger of a caterpillar.  Gradually they become involved with love, lust, and spiritually.  That man considers her as his daughter, lover, mother, and above all these, as a Goddess.  They both madly love each other, through the internet and on the phone.  They use obscene language and they kiss each other online.  Kuki does not lead a happy conjugal life though she has a love marriage with Aniket.  But the novel is not limited to only a love story.

It has a greater aspect. It deals with the relationship between State and individual. Safique is not a Muslim by temperament, but as a historian, thinks the Pakistan of today has separated itself from its roots and looks towards Arabian legends for his history.  He protests that the syllabus of history for the school would start from seventh century A.D., not from the Mahenjodaro and Harappa.  Safique was once arrested after the bomb blast of London for allegation of being associated with the terrorist, but is it a fact?  Later Kuki came to know that Safiques is trapped by a military junta.  The ex-lover of Safique's wife had revenged on Safique by arresting him with an allegation of terrorism.

Here, the author deals with the question of terrorism. There is often discussion about terrorism caused by an individual or by a group.  Society rarely discusses terrorism caused by a state.

What is a state?  Is it a group of people that resides within political and geographical boundaries?  Are a state's identity, mood and wishes separate from its ruler?  Is the wish of George W. Bush not considered as the wish of America?  Has it reflected the mood and wish of the people of America?  So, every time, the state's arranged anarchism or terrorism is merely a reflection of a terrorism caused by an individual. The great truth lies beneath Safique, as a terrorist, develops from the mind of a military man.

The author has successfully painted the difference of sensibility towards sexuality between male and female and has her own credibility for the frankness to deal with sensitive matters, be they matters of politics or matters of sexuality. She has gained a reputation and has her own place in the history of Odia fiction.

Awards 

 Odisha Sahitya Academy Award, 1993
 Jhankar Award, 1992
 Bhubaneswar Book Fair Award, 1993
 Prajatantra Award, 1981,1993
 Ladli Media Award, 2011

Selected bibliography

Novels 

 Upanibesh (1998)
 Pratibandi (1999) 
 Swapna Khojali Mane (2000)
 Mahajatra (2001)
 Gambhiri Ghara (2005)
 Bishad Ishwari (2006)
 Pakshibasa (2007)
 Asamajik (2008)

Short stories 
She has published ten anthologies of short stories.

Her English anthologies of short stories are:

 Sarojini Sahoo Stories (2006) 
 Waiting for Manna (2008) 

Her some of short stories have been anthologised in Hindi:

 Rape Tatha Anya Kahaniyana (2010) 

Some of her short stories have also been anthologized into Bengali:

 Dukha Aprimita(2012) is one of her Bengali version of short stories, translated by Arita Bhoumik Adhikari and published from Bangladesh.

Her other Odia anthologies of short stories are:

 Sukhara Muhanmuhin (1981)
 Nija GahirareNije (1989)
 Amrutara Pratikshare (1992)
 Chowkath (1994)
 Tarali Jauthiba Durga (1995)
 Deshantari (1999)
 Dukha Apramita (2006)
 Srujani Sarojini (2008)

See also
 List of Indian writers

References

Sources

Print

Primary sources
 Sahoo, Sarojini. Sarojini Sahoo Short Stories. Grassroots, 2006. 
 Sahoo, Sarojini. Waiting for Manna, Indian AGE Communication, 2008. 
 Sahoo, Sarojini. The Dark Abode, Indian AGE Communication, 2008. 
 Sahoo, Sarojini. Mithya Gerosthali, Anupam Prakashani, Dhaka, Bangladesh, 2007. 
 Sukhara Muhanmuhin  (1981)
 NijaGahirareNije (1989)
 Amrutara Pratikshare (1992)
 Chowkath (1994)
 Tarali Jauthiba Durga (1995)
 Upanibesh (1998)
 Pratibandi   (1999)
 Gambhiri Ghara  (2005)

Secondary sources
 Oriya Women's Writing : Paul St-Pierre and Ganeswar Mishra, Sateertha Publication, 
 The Amari Gapa (Odia Literary Journal), Special Issue on Sarojini: May–July 2006

1956 births
Living people
People from Dhenkanal district
Indian feminist writers
Feminist studies scholars
Indian feminists
Indian women novelists
English-language writers from India
Indian women short story writers
Indian women essayists
Odia-language writers
Writers from Odisha
Odia short story writers
Odia novelists
Novelists from Odisha
Women writers from Odisha
Scholars from Odisha
Indian women philosophers
Utkal University alumni
20th-century Indian novelists
20th-century Indian philosophers
20th-century Indian essayists
20th-century Indian short story writers
21st-century Indian novelists
21st-century Indian short story writers
21st-century Indian essayists
20th-century Indian women writers
21st-century Indian women writers
21st-century Indian philosophers
21st-century Indian women scientists
21st-century Indian social scientists
20th-century Indian women scientists
20th-century Indian scientists